The Great Western Railway (GWR) 6959 or Modified Hall Class is a class of 4-6-0 steam locomotive.  They were a development by Frederick Hawksworth of Charles Collett's earlier Hall Class named after English and Welsh country houses.

Background
Although the GWR had been at the forefront of British locomotive development between 1900 and 1930, the 1930s saw a degree of complacency at Swindon reflected in the fact that many designs and production methods had not kept pace with developments elsewhere. This was especially true with the useful GWR 4900 Class, the design of which largely originated in the 1900s and had not fundamentally changed since the mid-1920s.  Charles Collett was replaced as the Chief Mechanical Engineer of the Railway by F.W. Hawksworth in 1941 who immediately created a modified version of the design, known as the 'Modified Hall Class'.

Design
The Modified Halls marked the most radical change to Swindon Works' practice since Churchward's time as chief mechanical engineer and was very far from a simple modification of the Hall design. 'Although in outward appearance it looked almost the same, nearly everything about it was new.' Hawksworth's use of plate frames throughout the design was a break with Churchward's practice for 2 cylinder locomotives. The cylinders were cast separately from the smokebox saddle and bolted to the frames on each side. A stiffening brace was inserted between the frames and extended to form the smokebox saddle. The exhaust pipes leading from the cylinders to the blastpipe were incorporated into this assembly.

Additionally, Churchward's bar framed bogie which had been adapted for the original Hall prototype in 1924 was replaced by a plate frame structure with individual springing. There were changes, too, above the running board. Hawksworth decided that the declining quality of coal reaching Great Western depots necessitated a higher degree of superheating. A larger three-row superheater and header regulator were fitted into Swindon No.1 boiler. Improvements were subsequently made to the draughting on some engines, while others were fitted with hopper ashpans.

Production
The first batch of twelve Modified Halls was delivered from Swindon works between March and September 1944. They carried plain black livery, were unnamed and numbered 6959-6970 (immediately following the Hall Class sequence). They were all subsequently named between 1946 and 1948.

A further batch of ten locomotives appeared during October and November 1947 and others were on order when the nationalisation of Britain's railways took place in 1948. British Railways continued construction of this class until November 1950, by which time there were seventy-one examples.

Some modified Halls were equipped with a flat, high-sided Hawksworth tenders. Once he became Chief Mechanical Engineer, many earlier locomotives also received these tenders so a Hawksworth tender does not necessarily mean a Hawksworth locomotive.

Assessment
The Modified Hall class 'ran freely, steamed well and were popular with both footplate and maintenance staff. After the unambitious designs of Collett's final years, they restored Swindon's reputation.' Fourteen survived until the end of steam on the former GWR in 1965.

List of locomotives
 See List of GWR 6959 Class locomotives

Preservation
Six Modified Halls have been  preserved on various heritage railways. A seventh survivor no 7927 Willington Hall is being used as a donor for the Grange and County re-creation projects.

Out of the six engines to be preserved, five engines have run in preservation. The only engine yet to run is 6984 Owsden Hall. Half of the class have also seen main line operation: Nos. 6960 Raveningham Hall, 6990 Witherslack Hall and 6998 Burton Agnes Hall. 6960 and 6998 saw main use in the 1980s, especially in 1985 when the locos were regularly used during the GW150 Celebrations. 6998 was a popular mainline performer in the late 1980s, and also in the 1990s, until 1996 when she was withdrawn from operation awaiting an overhaul. Three of the class are currently operational but since 6998 was withdrawn no Modified Halls have been seen running on the main line.

See also 
 List of GWR standard classes with two outside cylinders

References

External links 

Great Western Archives - Modified Hall Class.

 
6959
4-6-0 locomotives
Railway locomotives introduced in 1944
Standard gauge steam locomotives of Great Britain
2′C h2 locomotives